Jim Palazzolo is a former American football coach.  He served as the head football coach at Rocky Mountain College from 1983 to 1986 and  Southern Oregon University from 1989 until 1995, compiling a career college football coaching record of 46–50–2.

Head coaching record

References

Year of birth missing (living people)
Living people
Ithaca Bombers football coaches
Rocky Mountain Battlin' Bears football coaches
Southern Oregon Raiders football coaches